Axinoptera penataran is a moth in the family Geometridae. It is found on Borneo.

The length of the forewings is about 9 mm for males and 7–10 mm for females. The ground colour of the wings is pale orange-brown with blackish fasciation.

References

Moths described in 1997
Eupitheciini
Moths of Indonesia